Henryk Ganzera (11 March 1903 – 1942) was a Polish wrestler. He competed in the men's Greco-Roman bantamweight at the 1928 Summer Olympics.

References

External links
 

1903 births
1942 deaths
Polish male sport wrestlers
Olympic wrestlers of Poland
Wrestlers at the 1928 Summer Olympics
People from Rybnik
Sportspeople from Silesian Voivodeship
German military personnel killed in World War II
20th-century Polish people